Kenneth T. Orr (May 10, 1939 – June 14, 2016) was an American software engineer, executive and consultant, known for his contributions in the field of software engineering to structured analysis and with the Warnier/Orr diagram.

Education 
Orr received his BA in Mathematics and Physics in 1960 from Wichita State University, and his MA in Philosophy in 1963 from the University of Chicago.

Career 
Orr started his career as Director of Information Systems at the State of Kansas in 1970. In 1973 he founded his own firm Ken Orr & Associates, which he directed until 1985. He was Professor at the School of Technology and Information Management of the Washington University in St. Louis, where he directed its Center for the Innovative Application of Technology. From 1988 until his death he was President of the Ken Orr Institute. Beginning in 2000, Ken served as a Cutter Consortium Fellow and Senior Consultant. Ken Orr died on June 14, 2016.

Publications 
Books
 
 

Articles, a selection
 
 
  Word document version.

References

External links 
 The Ken Orr Institute (KOI)

American business executives
American software engineers
Wichita State University alumni
University of Chicago alumni
Washington University in St. Louis faculty
1939 births
2016 deaths